Van Pelt is a Dutch toponymic surname meaning "from Pelt". Pelt was a region in Belgian Limburg including the modern municipality of Overpelt, It could also refer to the neighboring Peel, Netherlands. People with this surname include:

 Alex Van Pelt (born 1970), American football quarterback and coach
 Alison Van Pelt (born 1963), American painter
 Brad Van Pelt (1951–2009), American football linebacker
 Bradlee Van Pelt (born 1980), American football quarterback and safety, son of Brad
 Bo Van Pelt (born 1975), American golfer
 Calvin Leroy Van Pelt (1924–2011), Native American businessman
 Daniel Van Pelt (born 1964), American politician convicted of bribery
 Darin Van Pelt (born 1979), American aerospace engineer
 Erika Van Pelt (born 1985), American singer
 Frank P. Van Pelt (born 1861), Sandy Hook pilot
 Graham Van Pelt, Canadian musician and songwriter
 James Van Pelt (born 1954), American science fiction author
 Jim Van Pelt (born 1935), American football quarterback
 John Vredenburgh Van Pelt (1874–1962), American architect
 Patricia Van Pelt (born 1957), American (Illinois) politician
 Robert Van Pelt (1897–1988), American (Nebraska) judge
 Robert Jan van Pelt (born 1955), Dutch historian and Holocaust scholar.
 Scott Van Pelt (born 1966), American sportscaster
 Sydney James Van Pelt (1908–1976), Australian medical doctor and hypnotist
 William Van Pelt (1905–1996), American politician, representative from Wisconsin
 Wouter van Pelt (born 1968), Dutch field hockey player

Fictional characters
Three siblings from the Peanuts comic strip: Linus, Lucy and Rerun Van Pelt
 Van Pelt, a fictional character and antagonist from the 1995 American fantasy adventure film, Jumanji and the Jumanji Television series
 Grace Van Pelt, in TV series The Mentalist
Maddie Van Pelt, from the Nickelodeon series Every Witch Way
Russell Van Pelt, the primary antagonist character in the 2017 American fantasy comedy film, Jumanji: Welcome to the Jungle

Other uses 
 The Van Pelt, an indie rock band
 Van Pelt Library, the University of Pennsylvania's main library, named after Charles Patterson Van Pelt, the major donor at the time of construction.
 Van Pelt Manor in Brooklyn, New York, named after the Dutch settler Teunis Laenen van Pelt
 Mount Van Pelt, mountain in Antarctica

References

Dutch-language surnames
Surnames of Dutch origin